Nihotunga is a genus of crustaceans belonging to the monotypic family Nihotungidae.

The species of this genus are found in Australia and New Zealand.

Species:

Nihotunga iluka 
Nihotunga noa 
Nihotunga traudlina

References

Amphipoda